The Wolseley Centre is a visitor centre and nature reserve of the Staffordshire Wildlife Trust, in Staffordshire, England, about  north-west of Rugeley, and about  south-east of the county town of Stafford.

The Trust has two visitor centres; the other is at Westport Lake in Stoke-on-Trent.

History

Wolseley Hall
The site was formerly the gardens of Wolseley Hall, which was built in the late 17th century. The hall was demolished in 1966; in the 1990s there was some restoration of the gardens, by Sir Charles Wolseley. The site was later converted into a nature reserve, and it has been the headquarters of the Staffordshire Wildlife Trust since 2003.

Redevelopment
From November 2018 the site was redeveloped, to have a new café with views across the adjacent lake, an improved car park and other features across the site. The redeveloped centre was officially opened on 12 June 2019 by the Lord Lieutenant of Staffordshire.

Grounds
A boardwalk enables views of pools and marshland. There are a wildlife garden and display gardens, and a sensory garden. The paths and boardwalk are suitable for wheelchair users.

References

Nature reserves in Staffordshire
Tourist attractions in Staffordshire
Visitor centres in England
Nature centres in England